Royal Air Force Kelstern or RAF Kelstern is a former Royal Air Force station  south east of  Binbrook, Lincolnshire and  north west of Louth, Lincolnshire, England.

Station history
The airfield first opened in 1917 as a night landing ground before closing in 1919.

RAF Kelstern re-opened in 1943 and the following squadrons used the airfield:
 No. 33 Squadron RAF.
 No. 170 Squadron RAF reformed at the airfield on 15 October 1944 with the Avro Lancaster I and III before moving to RAF Dunholme Lodge on 22 October 1944.
 No. 625 Squadron RAF reformed at Kelstern on 1 October 1943 with the Lancaster I and III before moving to RAF Scampton on 5 April 1945, where the squadron disbanded on 14 October 1945.

See also
List of former Royal Air Force stations

References

Citations

Bibliography

East Lindsey District
Royal Air Force stations in Lincolnshire
Royal Air Force stations of World War II in the United Kingdom